Fredrikshald may refer to:

 Fredrikshald Bay, Nunavut, Canada
 Fredrikshald, Norway, former name of the town of Halden